The 2017 Tour de Hongrie was a six-day cycling stage race that took place in Hungary in June and July 2017. The race was the 38th edition of the Tour de Hongrie, and was rated as a 2.2 event as part of the 2017 UCI Europe Tour. The race included 5 stages plus the prologue, starting in Szombathely on 27 June and finishing on 2 July in Budapest.

The race was won by Colombia's Daniel Jaramillo, after winning the race's penultimate stage in Miskolc. Jaramillo finished two seconds clear of top young and Hungarian rider Barnabás Peák, riding for the Kontent–DKSI Cycling Team, while the podium was completed by 's Tadej Pogačar from Slovenia. In the race's other classifications, Scott Sunderland won the points classification after two stage victories, 's Amanuel Gebrezgabihier was the winner of the mountains classification, while his  squad won the teams classification.

Schedule
The first stage was cancelled due to inclement weather.

Participating teams
20 teams were invited to the 2017 Tour de Hongrie: one UCI Professional Continental team, eleven UCI Continental teams along with eight other teams, consisting of six domestic Hungarian teams, a regional team and a Serbian national team.

 and the Astana Track Team withdrew from the race before it started, therefore eighteen teams took to the start in Szombathely.

Stages

Prologue
27 June 2017 — Szombathely (Main Square), individual time trial (ITT)

Stage 1
28 June 2017 — Keszthely to Zalaegerszeg, 

The stage was cancelled due to inclement weather.

Stage 2
29 June 2017 — Velence to Siófok,

Stage 3
30 June 2017 — Paks to Cegléd,

Stage 4
1 July 2017 — Karcag to Miskolc,

Stage 5
2 July 2017 — Jászberény to Budapest,

Classification leadership table

Final standings

General classification

Points classification

Mountains classification

Young rider classification

Hungarian rider classification

Teams classification

See also

 2017 in men's road cycling
 2017 in sports

Notes

References

External links

2017
Tour de Hongrie
Tour de Hongrie